Ivan Jukić (born 27 December 1977) is a Croatian rower. He competed in the men's double sculls event at the 2000 Summer Olympics.

References

1977 births
Living people
Croatian male rowers
Olympic rowers of Croatia
Rowers at the 2000 Summer Olympics
Sportspeople from Vukovar